This list comprises all players who have participated in at least one league match for Tampa Bay Mutiny from the team's first Major League Soccer season in 1996 until its last season, in 2001. Players who were on the roster but never played a first team game are not listed; players who appeared for the team in other competitions (US Open Cup, CONCACAF Champions League, etc.) but never actually made an MLS appearance are noted at the bottom of the page.

A "†" denotes players who only appeared in a single match.

A
  Joseph Addo
  Cesar Alvarado †
  Kevin Anderson

B
  Derek Backman
  Kalin Bankov
  Devin Barclay
  João Batista
  Adin Brown
  Manuel Bucuane
  Scott Budnick
  Boniface Okafor

C
  Scott Cannon
  Chiquinho Conde
  Ali Curtis

D
  Craig Demmin
  Eric Denton
  Mamadou Diallo
  Raúl Díaz Arce
  John Diffley
  Mark Dougherty
  Paul Dougherty
  Mike Duhaney

E
  Jan Eriksson

F
  Marco Ferruzzi
  Adam Frye

G
  Giuseppe Galderisi
  Scott Garlick
  Sam George
  Gilmar
  Jefferson Gottardi
  Don Gramenz

H
  Bill Harte
  Frankie Hejduk
  Daniel Hernandez
  Chris Houser
  Goran Hunjak

J
  Jair
  Guillermo Jara

K
  Harut Karapetyan
  Gus Kartes†
  Josh Keller
  Brian Kelly
  Dominic Kinnear
  Cle Kooiman
  Ritchie Kotschau
  Wojtek Krakowiak

L
  Manny Lagos
  Greg Lalas
  Roy Lassiter
  Brian Loftin
  Alex Luna

M
  John Maessner
  Amos Magee
  Pete Marino
  Chad McCarty
  Ivan McKinley
  R.T. Moore
  Alberto Munoz

P
  Danny Pena
  Doug Petras
  Steve Pittman
  Kevin Peterson 

  Alan Prampin

Q
  Eric Quill

R
  Steve Ralston
  Mauricio Ramos
  Thomas Ravelli

S
  Jorge Salcedo
  Paul Schneider 
  Musa Shannon
  Diego Soñora

T
  Steve Trittschuh
  Maximiliano Torrillas

V
  Carlos Valderrama
  Nelson Vargas
  Martin Vasquez
  Diego Viera

W
  Roy Wegerle
  Evans Wise

Y
  Frank Yallop
  Paul Young

Z
  Jacek Ziober

Sources
 

Tampa Bay Mutiny
 
Association football player non-biographical articles